Don "Wink" Martindale (born May 19, 1963) is an American football coach who is the defensive coordinator for the New York Giants of the National Football League (NFL). From 2018 to 2021, he held the same position for the Baltimore Ravens after spending the previous six seasons as the team's linebackers coach.

Early years
Don Martindale was born on May 19, 1963, in Dayton, Ohio. Martindale attended Trotwood-Madison High School where he played linebacker for the Trotwood-Madison Rams and was an All-State selection his senior year.

He is an alumnus of Defiance College, where he played on the football team. He got his nickname during his freshman year, when one of his teammates called him "Wink" after the longtime TV game show host, Wink Martindale.

Right after college, Martindale took a job with his family's trucking company, hauling brake parts every day from Dayton, Ohio, to Detroit. It was a grueling six hour drive round-trip and he hated it, so he quit after a year to pursue his passion for coaching football.

Coaching career

College
Martindale started his coaching career in the late 1980s at his alma mater, Defiance College, as an assistant for the Yellow Jackets. Martindale also coached for three seasons at Western Kentucky University on the staff of Jack Harbaugh. He also coached for three years at the University of Cincinnati, and in 1994 and 1995 was a defensive assistant at Notre Dame for teams that went to the Fiesta Bowl and Orange Bowl.

Oakland Raiders
From 2004 to 2008 he was the linebackers coach for the Oakland Raiders and was at one time under consideration to be their defensive coordinator.

Denver Broncos
In 2009, Martindale was hired by the Denver Broncos as their linebackers coach. He was promoted to defensive coordinator in 2010.

Baltimore Ravens
On February 2, 2012, the Ravens signed Martindale as linebackers coach. He had worked for Ravens head coach John Harbaugh's father, Jack, when he was an assistant at Western Kentucky.

Martindale was part of the Ravens' coaching staff that won Super Bowl XLVII. In 2018, he was promoted to defensive coordinator. On January 21, 2022, Martindale and the Ravens parted ways.

New York Giants
Martindale was hired on February 11, 2022, by the New York Giants to be their defensive coordinator.

Personal life
Martindale and his wife, Laura, have two children.

References

1963 births
Living people
American football linebackers
Cincinnati Bearcats football coaches
Defiance Yellow Jackets football coaches
Defiance Yellow Jackets football players
Denver Broncos coaches
Notre Dame Fighting Irish football coaches
Oakland Raiders coaches
New York Giants coaches
Western Illinois Leathernecks football coaches
Western Kentucky Hilltoppers football coaches
National Football League defensive coordinators